The Hong Kong Film Award for Best Action Choreography is an annual Hong Kong industry award presented to a choreographer or a group of choreographers for the best achievement in action choreography.

History
The award was established at the 2nd Hong Kong Film Awards (1983) and the first winner in this category was the group of choreographers Sammo Hung, Lam Ching-ying, Yuen Biao & Billy Chan Wui-Ngai for their contribution in staging the action scenes of The Prodigal Son. The most recent recipient of the award was Hong Kong Action Star Donnie Yen, who was honoured at the 34th Hong Kong Film Awards (2015), for the film Kung Fu Jungle.

Since action scenes have an essential role in Hong Kong action cinema, this award is regarded as an important category of the Hong Kong Film Awards.

The action choreographers with the most wins:
Jackie Chan Stunt Team – 7 wins
Yuen Woo-ping – 6 wins
Sammo Hung – 5 wins
Stephen Tung Wai – 5 wins
Donnie Yen – 4 wins

Note that, uncredited, Donnie Yen was also action co-choreographer for the winners Ip Man, Ip Man 2, and Bodyguards and Assassins, bringing his total up to 7 wins unofficially.

The action choreographers with the most nominations:
Sammo Hung – 22 nominations
Jackie Chan Stunt Team – 16 nominations
Stephen Tung Wai – 16 nominations
Yuen Woo-ping – 12 nominations
Donnie Yen – 8 nominations

Winners and nominees

See also 
 Hong Kong Film Award
 Hong Kong Film Award for Best Actor
 Hong Kong Film Award for Best Actress
 Hong Kong Film Award for Best Supporting Actor
 Hong Kong Film Award for Best Supporting Actress
 Hong Kong Film Award for Best Cinematography
 Hong Kong Film Award for Best Director
 Hong Kong Film Award for Best Film
 Hong Kong Film Award for Best New Performer

References

External links
 Hong Kong Film Awards Official Site

Hong Kong Film Awards
Awards established in 1983